Apsey Point was a farming and fishing settlement in the Trinity District. Banking was done at Harbor Grace. In 1911 the population was 180.

See also
List of ghost towns in Newfoundland and Labrador

Ghost towns in Newfoundland and Labrador